Ronald Charles Hobba (15 March 1918 – 14 January 1999) was a former Australian rules footballer who played with Melbourne in the Victorian Football League (VFL).

Notes

External links 

1918 births
Australian rules footballers from Victoria (Australia)
Melbourne Football Club players
Brunswick Football Club players
1999 deaths